"Every Day's a Holiday" is a song written by Sam Coslow and Barry Trivers. The song was recorded by Glenn Miller and His Orchestra on Brunswick Records in 1938.

The song was released as a Brunswick 78 single, 8071, backed with "Sweet Stranger", in January, 1938 by Glenn Miller and his Orchestra which reached number 17 on Billboard, staying on the charts for one week. The vocals were by Kathleen Lane.

The song was featured in the 1937 Paramount Pictures film Every Day's a Holiday sung by Mae West.

References

Sources
Flower, John (1972). Moonlight Serenade: a bio-discography of the Glenn Miller Civilian Band. New Rochelle, NY: Arlington House. .
Miller, Glenn (1943). Glenn Miller's Method for Orchestral Arranging. New York: Mutual Music Society. ASIN: B0007DMEDQ
Simon, George Thomas (1980). Glenn Miller and His Orchestra. New York: Da Capo paperback. .
Simon, George Thomas (1971). Simon Says. New York: Galahad. .
Schuller, Gunther (1991). Volume 2 of The Swing Era:the Development of Jazz, 1930–1945 /. New York: Oxford University Press. .

Holiday songs
Glenn Miller songs
1930s jazz standards
1937 songs
Songs written for films
Jazz compositions
Songs written by Sam Coslow